The Kansas City Chiefs have completed 62 seasons in professional American football and 52 with the National Football League (NFL).

The team began play as a charter member of the American Football League (AFL) in 1960 as the Dallas Texans. In 1963, the team relocated to Kansas City, Missouri and was renamed the Kansas City Chiefs. The team has played in 966 total games in a total of 63 seasons, and a winning percentage of .546. The Chiefs' 14–2 season in 2020 remains their best regular season record to date while their 2–14 records in 2008 and 2012 remain their worst.

The Texans/Chiefs were the winningest team in the history of the AFL, compiling an 87–48 record from 1960 to 1969. The team won three league championships and served as the AFL's representative in Super Bowls I and IV in the 1966 and 1969 seasons. Since the franchise's alignment to the NFL in 1970, they have won 13 division titles, with seven straight from 2016 to 2022, and eight wild card playoff berths, four of which were between 1990 and 1997 when the team never lost as many games as it won. Despite the franchise's early success, the Chiefs did not win a postseason game between the 1993 and 2015 playoffs, and their Super Bowl IV victory on January 11, 1970 was the franchise's lone Super Bowl title until Super Bowl LIV on February 2, 2020. It was also a long drought between AFC Championship games, with their appearance in the 2018 playoffs being their first since 1993. The Chiefs' first home AFC Championship game ended in an overtime defeat as the New England Patriots moved on to win a record-tying sixth Super Bowl ring.

The Chiefs have suffered two main periods of failure. Between 1972 and 1985 the Chiefs never appeared in the postseason and achieved only one winning season (in 1981) from 1974 until 1985. Between 2007 and 2012, the Chiefs also struggled, with two two-win and two four-win seasons. However, the recent Chiefs have done much better, with an 129–52 record (including postseason) and recording more wins than losses every year from the 2013 to 2022 seasons. In their 10 seasons under Andy Reid, the Chiefs have eight consecutive playoff seasons and seven consecutive division titles. In addition, the team competed in three Super Bowls, with two wins (LIV, LVII) and one loss (LV).

Seasons

Notes

References

 
 
 
 
 
 

 
Kansas City Chiefs
seasons